This is a list for articles on notable historical forts which may or may not be under current active use by a military. There are also many towns named after a Fort, the largest being Fort Worth, Texas, United States.

Antigua and Barbuda

 Fort James, Antigua

Armenia

 Amberd
 Bjni Fortress
 Dashtadem Fortress
 Ertij Fort
 Halidzor Fortress
 Kakavaberd
 Kosh Fortress
 Lori Fortress
 Meghri Fortress
 Odzaberd
 Proshaberd
 Sardarapat Fortress
 Sev Berd
 Vorotnaberd

Artsakh

Australia
Sydney Harbour fortifications

 Beehive Casemate
 Bradleys Head Fortification Complex
 Fort Denison
 Fort Kirribilli
 Fort Macquarie
 Georges Head Battery
 Lower Georges Heights Commanding Position
 Middle Head Fortifications
 Steel Point Battery

Other fortifications

 Bare Island Fort
 Ben Buckler Gun Battery
 Breakwater Battery
 Drummond Battery
 Flagstaff Hill Fort
 Fort Banks
 Fort Glanville
 Fort Lytton
 Fort Nepean
 Fort Pearce
 Fort Philip
 Fort Queenscliff
 Fort Scratchley
 Henry Head Fort
 Illowra Battery
 Malabar Battery
 Old Rainworth Fort
 Signal Hill Battery
 Smiths Hill Fort
 South Channel Fort
 Swan Island Fort
 Wallace Battery

Bahamas

 Fort Charlotte
 Fort Fincastle
 Fort Montagu
 Old Fort of Nassau

Bahrain

 Arad Fort
 Riffa Fort
 Qalat Al Bahrain

Bangladesh

 Hajiganj Fort
 Idrakpur Fort
 Jangalbari Fort
 Jinjira Palace (also used as a fort)
 Lalbagh Fort
 Sonakanda Fort

Barbados

St Ann's Fort

Belarus

 Babruysk fortress
 Brest fortress

Belgium

Province of Antwerp
Antwerp

 Fort de Stabroeck
 Redoute de Berendrecht
 Redoute de Capellen
 Fort de Brasschaet
 Fort de Schooten
 Redoute de Schilde
 Fort de Lierre
 Forte de Wavre-Sainte-Catherine
 Fort de Breendonck
 Fort de Liezele
 Redoute de Puers
 Fort de Bornhem
 Fort de Steendorp

Antwerp (historical) (1914, internal defenses)
 Redoute d'Oorderen
 Fort de Zwyndrecht

Province of Liège

 Fort d'Aubin-Neufchâteau
 Fort de Barchon
 Fort de Battice
 Fort de la Chartreuse
 Citadelle of Liège
 Fort d'Eben-Emael
 Fort d'Évegnée
 Fort de Fléron
 Fort de Chaudfontaine
 Fort d'Embourg
 Fort de Boncelles
 Fort de Flémalle
 Fort de Hollogne
 Fort de Loncin
 Fort de Lantin
 Fort de Liers
 Fort de Pontise
 Fort de Tancrémont

Province of Namur
Namur (1914, clockwise from E, right bank of Meuse River)

 Fort de Maizeret
 Fort d'Andoy
 Fort de Dave
 Fort de Malonne
 Fort de Suarlée
 Fort de Cognelée
 Fort de Marchovelette

Bermuda
Bermuda had around 90 coastal defense forts and batteries scattered all over the island chain. Early colonial defense works constructed before the 19th century were primarily small coastal batteries built of stone having anywhere from two to ten guns. Some of these early forts and batteries are the oldest standing masonry forts in the new world. Later forts constructed by the royal engineers were much larger and more complex. 
 Fort St. Catherine
 The Martellos (Towers)/Ferry Reach
 King's Castle
 Fort Victoria, Bermuda

Brazil

Amapá
 Fortaleza de São José de Macapá

Bahia
 Forte de Santa Maria
 Forte de Santo Antônio da Barra
 Forte de Santo Antônio Além do Carmo
 Forte de São Diogo
 Forte de São Lourenço
 São Marcelo Fort

Ceará
 Fortaleza de Nossa Senhora da Assunção

Pará
 Forte do Castelo de Belém

Paraná
 Fortaleza de Nossa Senhora dos Prazeres

Paraíba
 Forte de Santa Catarina

Pernambuco
 Forte de Nossa Senhora dos Remédios
 Fort Orange
 Forte de Santo Inácio de Tamandaré
 Forte de São João Batista do Brum
 Forte de São Tiago das Cinco Pontas

Rio de Janeiro
 Fort Copacabana
 Fortaleza de Nossa Senhora da Conceição
 Fortaleza de Santa Cruz da Barra
 Forte de São Domingos de Gragoatá
 Fortaleza de São João
 Forte de São Luís
 Forte de São Mateus do Cabo Frio

Rio Grande do Norte
 Forte dos Reis Magos

Santa Catarina
 Fortaleza de Santa Cruz de Anhatomirim
 Fortaleza de São José da Ponta Grossa

São Paulo
 Forte de São João da Bertioga

Bulgaria

 Anevo Fortress, Sopot Municipality
 Asen's Fortress, Asenovgrad
 Baba Vida castle, Vidin
 Belogradchik fortress, Belogradchik
 Bozhenishki Urvich, near Botevgrad
 Castra Martis Roman fortress, Kula, Bulgaria
 Cherven fortress, Cherven, Ruse Province
 Hisarya fortress, Hisarya
 Kaliakra cape castle, Bulgarian Black Sea Coast
 Kovachevsko kale, Kovachevets
 Kyustendil fortress Hisarlaka
 Lyutitsa, Ivaylovgrad
 Markeli Roman fortress, Karnobat
 Oescus Roman fortress, Gigen
 Pliska capital city castle and fortress
 Plovdiv fortifications and walls - Eastern gate of Philippopolis, Hisar Kapia and Nebet Tepe
 Preslav capital city  castle and fortress
 Nesebar town fortress
 Nicopolis ad Istrum Roman fortress and town, Nikyup, Veliko Tarnovo
 Nicopolis ad Nestum Roman fortress and town, Garmen, Gotse Delchev, Blagoevgrad Province
 Novae Roman fortress, Svishtov
 Rachovets fortress, Gorna Oryahovitsa
 Serdica fortress, Sofia
 Shumen fortress, Shumen
 Sostra, Lomets
 Storgosia, Pleven
 Trajan's Gate Roman fortress, near Sofia
 Trapezitsa fortress, Veliko Tarnovo
 Tsarevets fortress and castle, Veliko Tărnovo
 Tsepina, Dorkovo, near Velingrad, Western Rhodope Mountains
 Urvich castle, near Sofia
 Ustra, Eastern Rhodope Mountains

Canada
Many buildings and structures bear the name fort in Canada. Most of these places are either military installations, or a trading post that was established by a North American fur trading company. A number of "forts" in northern and western Canada were also established as exploratory, or policing outposts.

A number of municipalities in Canada include the term fort in their names. The municipalities that use the term fort in their name do so for historical reasons, with many of these communities resulting from the outgrowth of migrants that settled around the original fort. Many of these municipalities continue to bear use the term fort in their names, regardless of whether or not the original fortification and/or trading post still stands.

Military fortifications
The majority of military fortifications in Canada were built by the British, French, and Canadian armed forces. However, several military fortifications were erected by the Hudson's Bay Company, whose royal charter required them to fortify Rupert's Land. Other groups that erected military fortifications in Canada includes the First Nations, Spain, and the United States. Although military fortifications were built for strategic, and other military purposes, some military fortifications in Canada also housed trading posts, or was used by fur traders.

British Columbia

 Fort Rodd Hill
 Fort San Miguel
 Macaulay Point Battery
 Yorke Island
 Xudzedzalis

Manitoba

 Fort Rouge
 Prince of Wales Fort

New Brunswick

 Fort Beauséjour
 Fort Boishebert
 Carleton Martello Tower
 Fort Frederick
 Fort Nashwaak
 Fort Gaspareaux
 Fort Howe
 Fort Meductic
 Fort Menagoueche

Newfoundland and Labrador

 Cuper's Cove Fort
 Fort Frederick
 Fort McAndrew
 Fort Pepperrell
 Fort Plaisance
 Fort Royal
 Fort Townshend
 Fort Saint Louis
 Fort Waldegrave
 Fort William

Nova Scotia

 Connaught Battery
 Cranberry Point Battery
 Devils Battery
 Fort Anne
 Fort Clarence
 Fort Edward
 Fort Ellis
 Fort Lawrence
 Fort Sackville
 Fort Sainte Anne
 Fort St. Louis, Guysborough County
 Fort St. Louis, Shelburne County
 Fort Vieux Logis
 Fort William Augustus
 Fortress of Louisbourg
 Georges Island
 Halifax Citadel
 Prince of Wales Tower
 York Redoubt

Ontario

 Bois Blanc Blockhouse
 Fort Amherstburg
 Fort Drummond
 Fort Erie
 Fort Frederick
 Fort Frontenac
 Fort George
 Fort Henry
 Fort Malden
 Fort Mississauga
 Fort Norfolk
 Fort St. Joseph
 Fort Wellington
 Fort York
 Gibraltar Point Blockhouse
 New Fort York
 Sherbourne Blockhouse

Prince Edward Island
 Fort Amherst

Quebec

 Citadel of Montreal
 Citadelle of Quebec
 Fort Blunder
 Fort Chambly
 Fort de l'Île Sainte-Hélène
 Fort Ingall
 Fort Laprairie
 Fort Lennox
 Fort Richelieu
 Fort Saint-Jean
 Fort Sainte Thérèse
 Fort Senneville
 Fort Trois-Rivières
 Fort Ville-Marie
 Lévis Forts

Exploratory forts
Several private entities, most notably the Hudson's Bay Company, established outposts or forts, within northern Canada for the purposes of housing exploratory expeditions to the Arctic. Forts that were built exclusively for the purposes of housing exploratory expeditions include:

 Fort Confidence, Northwest Territories
 Fort Conger, Nunavut
 Fort Reliance, Northwest Territories

Fur trading forts

A number of trading posts operated by fur trading companies were also referred to as forts. Fur trading companies that operated trading forts in Canada includes the Hudson's Bay Company, and the North West Company. Many of these were simply stockades, log enclosures for trading posts, although a few were former military installations which was later used by fur trading companies.

Alberta

 Fort Edmonton
 Fort Victoria
 Fort Whoop-Up

British Columbia

 Fort Defiance
 Fort Langley
 Fort Victoria

Manitoba

 Fort Bourbon
 Fort Dauphin
 Fort des Épinettes
 Fort Douglas
 Fort Ellice
 Fort Garry
 Fort Gibraltar
 Fort La Reine
 Fort Maurepas
 Fort Paskoya
 Lower Fort Garry
 York Factory

Northwest Territories

 Fort Collinson
 Old Fort Providence

Nunavut
 Fort Ross

Ontario

 Fort Douville
 Fort Kaministiquia
 Fort Matachewan
 Fort Rouillé
 Fort Saint Pierre
 Fort Toronto
 Fort William

Quebec

 Fort Saint Jacques
 Fort Témiscamingue

Saskatchewan

 Fort Carlton
 Fort de la Corne
 Fort de la Rivière Tremblante
 Fort Espérance
 Fort La Jonquière
 Fort Pitt
 Fort Sturgeon
 Pine Island Fort

Yukon

 Fort Reliance
 Fort Selkirk

Law enforcement forts
The North-West Mounted Police (later merged with the Dominion Police to form the Royal Canadian Mounted Police) established a number of policing outposts in western Canada during the mid to late 19th century, in an effort to provide law enforcement in the region. Forts established by the North-West Mounted Police includes:

 Fort Battleford, Saskatchewan
 Fort Calgary, Alberta
 Fort Livingstone, Saskatchewan
 Fort Walsh, Saskatchewan

Channel Islands
Alderney
 Fort Clonque
Guernsey

 Bréhon Tower
 Fort Hommet
 Fort George, Guernsey
 Fort Grey
 Fort Saumarez

Jersey
 Fort Regent

Chile

 Arauco
 Fort Bulnes
 Fort Chepe
 Chivicura
 Fort Colcura
 Espíritu Santo
 Fort de la Encarnación
 Huaca de Chena
 Jesus de Huenuraquí
 Fort Livén
 Fort Lonquén
 Nuestra de Señora de Halle
 Fort Reina Luisa
 Fort Paicavi
 Pucara del Cerro La Muralla
 Pukara de La Compañia
 Pukará de Quitor
 San Cristóbal de La Paz
 San Fabián de Conueo
 San Ignacio de la Redención
 San Jerónimo de Millapoa
 Fort San Pedro
 San Rafael de Coelemu
 Santa Bárbara
 Santa Cruz de Oñez
 Santa Fe de la Ribera
 Fort Santa Margarita
 Santísima Trinidad
 Santo Árbol de la Cruz
 Fort Talcahuano
 Fort Tolpán
 Valdivian Fort System
 Fort Virguenco

China

Beijing

 Baimaguan Fort

Hong Kong
Chinese (Qing dynasty) forts

 Buddhist Hall (Tung Lung) Fort
 Fan Lau Fort
 Kowloon Walled City
 Tung Chung Fort
 Tung Chung Battery

British colonial forts
 Devil's Peak fortifications
 Lei Yue Mun Fort
 Murray Battery
 Pinewood Battery
 Stanley Fort

Macau
All forts in Macau were built during or used during Portuguese rule:

 Fortaleza da Guia
 Fortaleza de Mong Há
 Fortaleza do Monte

Tianjin
 Taku Forts, Tianjin

Colombia
 Castillo San Felipe de Barajas (Muralla de Cartagena de Indias)

Congo, Republic of the
 Fort de Shinkakasa

Croatia

 Brod Fortress
 Dubrovnik
 Glavaš – Dinarić Fortress
 Knin Fortress
 Fort Lovrijenac
 Mirabella Fortress
 Monkodonja
 Fort Nečven
 Nehaj Fortress
 Nesactium
 Prevlaka Fortress
 Prozor Fortress
 Starigrad Fortress
 Tvrđa

Cyprus

 Buffavento
 Kantara Castle
 Kyrenia Castle
 Saint Hilarion Castle

Denmark

 Flakfortet
 Middelgrundsfortet
 Trekroner Fort

Dominican Republic
 Fortaleza San Felipe

Egypt

Estonia
 Toomemägi
 Toompea
 Valjala Stronghold
 Varbola Stronghold
Fortifications of Peter the Great's Naval Fortress
 Aegna
 Kakumäe
 Naissaar
 Suurupi
 Viimsi

Finland

 Turku Castle (sv: Åbo Slott)
 Häme Castle (sv: Tavastehus), Hämeenlinna
 Vyborg Castle, Viipuri (now in Russia)
 Olavinlinna (St. Olaf's Castle), Savonlinna
 Suomenlinna (sv: Sveaborg), Helsinki
 fortress city of Hamina,
 Svartholm fortress, Loviisa
 Ruotsinsalmi sea fortress (sv: Svensksund) and Kyminlinna
 Bomarsund Fortress, Sund, Åland
 Korela Fortress (fi: Käkisalmi, sv: Kexholm), Priozersk (Now in Russia)
 Lappeenranta (sv. Villmanstrand) Fortress
 Kärnäkoski Fortress, Savitaipale

France

 Fort Bergues
 Fort Bayonne
 Fort de Bellegarde
 Bitche
 Fort Blaye
 Fort Bouillon
 Fort Boyard
 Fort Cambrai
 Fort Louvois or Fort du Chapus
 Fort Douaumont
 Fort-de-France (on the French Caribbean island of Martinique)
 Fort de Joux
 Fort Liberia (Villefranche-de-Conflent)
 Fort Montmédy
 Fort Le Quesnoy
 Fort Saint-Martin-de-Ré
 Fort de Vincennes
 Îles Saint-Marcouf

Vauban

Séré de Rivières system

 Fort des Adelphes
 Fort des Ayvelles
 Fort des Basses Perches
 Fort de Bois-d'Arcy
 Fort de Bois l'Abbé
 Fort du Bois d'Oye
 Fort de Bourlémont
 Fort du Bruissin
 Fort de Champigny
 Fort de Châtillon (Paris)
 Fort de Condé-sur-Aisne
 Fort de Cormeilles-en-Parisis
 Fort de la Croix-de-Bretagne
 Fort de Domont
 Fort Douaumont
 Fort Dubois
 Fort de Giromagny
 Fort des Hautes Perches
 Fort de l'Infernet
 Fort de Leveau
 Fort de Liouville
 Fort de Maulde
 Fort du Mont Bart
 Fort de Montmorency
 Fort de l'Olive
 Fort de Plappeville
 Fort de la Pompelle
 Fort de Queuleu
 Fort du Replaton
 Fort de Roppe
 Fort du Salbert
 Fort de Saint-Cyr
 Fort de Sucy
 Fort du Télégraphe
 Fort de Tournoux
 Fort du Trou-d'Enfer
 Fort d'Uxegney
 Fort de Vancia
 Fort de Vaujours
 Fort Vaux
 Fort de Villey-le-Sec
 Fort de Villiers
 Fort de Viraysse
 Fort de Vézelois

Maginot Line (Northeast)

 Ouvrage Les Sarts
 Ouvrage de Bersillies
 Ouvrage La Salmagne
 Ouvrage de Boussois
 Ouvrage La Ferté
 Ouvrage Chesnois
 Ouvrage Thonnelle
 Ouvrage Vélosnes
 Ouvrage Ferme Chappy (PO)
 Ouvrage Fermont (GO)
 Ouvrage Latiremont (GO)
 Ouvrage Mauvais-Bois (PO)
 Ouvrage Bois-du-Four (PO)
 Ouvrage Bréhain(GO)
 Ouvrage Aumetz (PO)
 Ouvrage Rochonvillers (GO)
 Ouvrage Molvange (GO)
 Ouvrage Soetrich (GO)
 Ouvrage Kobenbusch (GO)
 Ouvrage Galgenberg (GO)
 Ouvrage Métrich (GO)
 Ouvrage Billig (GO)
 Ouvrage Immerhof (PO)
 Ouvrage Bois-Karre (PO)
 Ouvrage Oberheid (PO)
 Ouvrage Sentzich (PO)
 Ouvrage Hackenberg (GO)
 Ouvrage Mont des Welches (GO)
 Ouvrage Michelsberg (GO)
 Ouvrage Anzeling (GO)
 Ouvrage Coucou (PO)
 Ouvrage Hobling (PO)
 Ouvrage Bousse (PO)
 Ouvrage Berenbach (PO)
 Ouvrage Bovenberg (PO)
 Ouvrage Denting (PO)
 Ouvrage Village de Coume (PO)
 Ouvrage Annexe Nord de Coume (PO)
 Ouvrage Coume (PO)
 Ouvrage Annexe Sud de Coume (PO)
 Ouvrage Mottenberg (PO)
 Ouvrage Kerfent (PO)
 Ouvrage Bambesch (PO)
 Ouvrage Einseling (PO)
 Ouvrage Laudrefang (PO)
 Ouvrage Téting (PO)
 Ouvrage Haut-Poirier
 Ouvrage Simserhof
 Ouvrage Schiesseck
 Ouvrage Welschhof
 Ouvrage Rohrbach
 Ouvrage Otterbiel
 Ouvrage Grand-Hohékirkel
 Ouvrage Four-à-Chaux
 Ouvrage Lembach
 Ouvrage Hochwald
 Ouvrage Schoenenbourg

Alpine Line (Maginot Southeast)

 Ouvrage Chatelard (PO)
 Ouvrage Cave-à-Canon (PO)
 Ouvrage Sapey (GO)
 Ouvrage Saint-Gobain (GO)
 Ouvrage Saint-Antoine (GO)
 Ouvrage Le Lavoir (GO)
 Ouvrage Pas du Roc (GO)
 Ouvrage Arrondaz (PO)
 Ouvrage Les Rochilles (PO)
 Ouvrage Janus (GO)
 Ouvrage Col de la Buffère (PO)
 Ouvrage Col du Granon (PO)
 Ouvrage Les Aittes (PO)
 Ouvrage Gondran (PO)
 Ouvrage Roche-la-Croix (GO)
 Ouvrage Saint Ours Haut (GO)
 Ouvrage Plate Lombard (PO)
 Ouvrage Fontvive Nord-ouest (PO)
 Ouvrage Saint Ours Nord-est (PO)
 Ouvrage Saint Ours Bas (PO)
 Ouvrage Ancien Camp (PO)
 Ouvrage Restefond (GO)
 Ouvrage Col de Restefond (PO)
 Ouvrage Granges Communes (PO)
 Ouvrage La Moutière (PO)
 Ouvrage Col de Crous (PO)
 Ouvrage Rimplas (GO)
 Ouvrage Fressinéa (PO)
 Ouvrage Valdeblore (PO)
 Ouvrage Col du Caire Gros (PO)
 Ouvrage Col du Fort(PO)
 Ouvrage Gordolon (GO)
 Ouvrage Flaut (GO)
 Ouvrage Baisse de Saint-Véran (PO)
 Ouvrage Plan Caval (PO)
 Ouvrage La Béole (PO)
 Ouvrage Col d'Agnon (PO)
 Ouvrage La Déa (PO)
 Ouvrage Col de Brouis (GO)
 Ouvrage Monte Grosso (GO)
 Ouvrage Champ de Tir (PO)
 Ouvrage L'Agaisen (GO)
 Ouvrage Saint-Roch (GO)
 Ouvrage Barbonnet (GO)
 Ouvrage Castillon (GO)
 Ouvrage Col des Banquettes (PO)
 Ouvrage Sainte-Agnès (GO)
 Ouvrage Col de Garde (PO)
 Ouvrage Mont Agel (GO)
 Ouvrage Roquebrune (GO)
 Ouvrage Croupe du Reservoir (PO)
 Ouvrage Cap Martin (GO)

Former German fortifications
 Fort de Mutzig

Moselstellung

 Fort d'Illange
 Fort de Guentrange
 Fort de Koenigsmacker
 Fort Jeanne d'Arc

Germany

 Ayers Kaserne
 Wildenstein Castle (Leibertingen)
 Ehrenbreitstein Fortress
 Grauerort fortress
 Königstein Fortress
 Moritzburg Fortress
 Petersberg Citadel
 Saalburg
 Spandau Citadel
 Fortress of Ulm
 Veste Coburg
 Veste Oberhaus
 Mainz Citadel

India

 Red Fort, Delhi                    
 Amer Fort, Rajasthan
 Agra Fort, Uttar Pradesh
 Jaisalmer Fort, Rajasthan
 Daulatabad fort, Maharashtra
 Golkonda Fort, Telangana
 Junagarh Fort, Bikaner, Rajasthan
 Gwalior Fort, Madhya Pradesh
 Jhansi Fort, Uttar Pradesh
 Chittorgarh Fort, Chittorgarh,  Rajasthan
 Mehrangarh Fort, Rajasthan
 Diu Fort, Daman and Diu
 Chapora Fort, Goa
 Pratapgad, Maharashtra
 Palakkad Fort, Kerala
 Jaigarh Fort, Rajasthan
 Kumbhalgarh, Rajasthan
 Raigad Fort, Maharashtra
 Ranthambore Fort, Rajasthan
 Bellary Fort, Karnataka
 Yadgir Fort, Karnataka
 Bekal Fort, Kerala
 Purana Qila, Delhi
 Warangal Fort, Andhra Pradesh
 Nahargarh Fort, Rajasthan
 Taragarh Fort, Rajasthan
 Bhangarh Fort, Rajasthan
 Fort Aguada, Goa

Indonesia

Java

 Batavia Castle (demolished)
 Citadel Prins Frederik (demolished, now Istiqlal Mosque, Jakarta)
 Kotagede's Cepuri
 Fort Portuguese
 Fort van den Bosch
 Fort van der Wijck
 Fort Vastenburg
 Fort Vredeburg
 Fort Willem I
 Fort Willem II
 Waterkasteel, Batavia (demolished)
 Fort Pendem

The Moluccas

 Fort Amsterdam, Ambon
 Fort Belgica
 Fort Kalamata
 Fort Nassau
 Fort Oranje, Ternate
 Fort Tolukko
 Fort Kastela
 Fort Duurstede
 Fort Tahula

Papua

 Fort Du Bus (demolished)

Sulawesi

 Otanaha Fortress
 Fort Rotterdam
 Buton Palace Fortress
 Fort Somba Opu

Sumatra

 Fort de Kock
 Fort Marlborough
 Fort van der Capellen

Iran

 Agha Khan Liravi-ye Castle
 Alamut Castle
 Ardalan Castle
 Ardeshir Castle
 Arg-e Bam
 Arg of Tabriz
 Atashgah Castle
 Babak Fort
 Bakhtak Leylan Castle
 Chaleshtar Castle
 Chanef Castle
 Ernan Castle
 Espakeh Castle
 Fort of Our Lady of the Conception
 Gabri Castle, Ray
 Geli Castle
 Gouged Stronghold
 Iraj Castle
 Izad-Khast Castle
 Junqan Castle
 Jushin Castle
 Kalat Ahram Castle
 Kangelo Castle
 Keshit Castle
 Leshtan Castle
 Lisar Castle
 Machi Castle
 Mansur Kuh Castle
 Manujan Castle
 Mozaffarabad Castle
 Naryn Castle, Meybod
 Qahqah Castle
 Qal'eh Dokhtar
 Rashkan Castle
 Rayen Castle
 Rey Castle
 Robat Castle
 Rudkhan Castle
 Sa'dabad Complex
 Sang Castle
 Sarvestan Palace
 Semiran Castle
 Shapur Khast
 Shavvaz Castle
 Zahhak Castle

Israel

 Acre
 Arsuf (a.k.a. Apollonia)
 Belveer
 Belvoir (a.k.a. Kochav Ha-Yarden كوكب الهوى kawkab al hwa)
 Beth Gibelin
 Besan
 Burj al Ahmar, (a.k.a. khirbet Burgata)
 Bokek Stronghold
 Binar Bashi (a.k.a. Antipatris Fortress)
 Caesarea
 Cafarlet (a.k.a. HaBonim Fortress)
 Casal des Plains
 Castellum Regis
 Château Pèlerin (a.k.a. Atlit Fortress عتليت etlit)
 Latrun لطرون
 Le Destroit
 Kal'at Al Mina (a.k.a. Ashdod-Yam Fortress) قلعة اسدود
 Masada (Metzada in Hebrew)
 Mirabel (a.k.a. Migdal Afek or Migdal Tsedek or majdal yaba in Arabic)
 Montfort Castle
 Nimrod Fortress (a.k.a. Qal'at Namrud)
 Qaqun Fortress
 Tower of David مسجد القلعه
 Sepphoris صفوريه
 Vadum Iacob (a.k.a. Ateret Fortress)
 Yehiam Fortress

Italy

Abruzzo
 Forte Spagnolo, L'Aquila

Aosta Valley
 Fort Bard, Bard

Apulia
 Forte a Mare, Brindisi

Liguria
 Walls of Genoa
 Priamar Fortress, Savona

Marche
 Fortress of San Leo, Marche

Piedmont
 Fenestrelle Fort, Piedmont

Tuscany
 Belvedere, Florence

Japan
 Goryōkaku, Hakodate, Hokkaidō

Kenya
 Fort Jesus

Libya
 Fort Capuzzo
 Fortress of Ghat

Lithuania

 Apuolė
 Aukštupėnai mound
 Karmazinai mound
 Kernavė
 Molavėnai
 Napoleon's Hill
 Pilėnai
 Ukmergė
 Voruta

Kaunas Fortress fortifications (listed in order of number)

 Seventh Fort
 Ninth Fort

Malaysia

 Fort Cornwallis
 Porta de Santiago or Fort A'Famosa
 Fort Margherita
 Fort Sylvia
 Kota Lukut
 Kota Belanda or Kota Dindingh
 Kota Ngah Ibrahim

Malta

 Fort Benghisa
 Fort Binġemma
 Fort Cambridge
 Fort Campbell
 Fort Chambray
 Fort Delimara
 Fort Leonardo
 Fort Madalena
 Fort Manoel
 Fort Mosta
 Fort Pembroke
 Fort Ricasoli
 Fort Rinella
 Fort Saint Angelo
 Fort Saint Elmo
 Fort San Lucian
 Fort Saint Michael
 Fort Saint Rocco
 Fort San Salvatore
 Fort Spinola
 Fort Tas-Silġ
 Fort Tigné
 Fort Verdala

Nepal

Netherlands

 Fort Nassau
 Fort Bourtange

Forts on the Dutch Water Line

 Fort Pampus
 Fort de Roovere
 Wierickerschans

Forts on the Stelling van Amsterdam

 Fort along Den Ham
 Fort near De Kwakel
 Muiden Fortress
 Fort Vijfhuizen
 Vuurtoreneiland

New Zealand

 Fort Ballance
 Fort Buckley
 Fort Jervois
 Gate Pā
 Harington Point
 North Head, New Zealand
 Ruapekapeka
 Stony Batter
 Wrights Hill Fortress

Norway

Pakistan

 Lahore Fort, Lahore city
 Rohtas Fort, Jhelum
 Altit Fort, Hunza Valley
 Baltit Fort, Karimabad
 Khaplu Fort, Khaplu
 Ranikot Fort, Jamshoro
 Rawat Fort, Islamabad
 Faiz Mahal, Khairpur
 Umerkot Fort, Umerkot

Panama

 Fort Amador
 Fort De Lesseps
 Fort Kobbe
 Fort Randolph (Panama)
 Fort Sherman

Peru
 Saksaywaman

Philippines

 Cuyo Fort, Cuyo Island, Palawan
 Fort Bonifacio, Taguig City 
 Fort Del Pilar, Baguio City
 Fort Drum (Philippines), El Fraile Island
 Fort Hughes, Caballo Island
 Fort Frank, Carabao Island
 Fort Magsaysay, Nueva Ecija
 Fort Mills, Corregidor Island
 Fort of the Conception and the Triumph, Ozamiz City
 Fort Pilar, Zamboanga City
 Fort San Pedro, Cebu City
 Fort San Pedro, Iloilo City
 Fort San Felipe, Cavite City
 Fort Santa Isabel, Taytay, Palawan
 Fort Santiago, Intramuros, Manila
 San Diego de Alcala Fortress, Gumaca, Quezon
 Cuartel de Santo Domingo, Santa Rosa City, Laguna
 Fort Wint, Grande Island, Subic Bay
 Idjang, Batanes

Poland

 Kłodzko Fortress
 Kraków Fortress
 Międzyrzecz Fortification Region
 Modlin Fortress
 Osowiec
 Poznań Fortress
 Toruń Fortress
 Warsaw Fortress

Portugal

 Belém Tower, Lisbon
 Citadel of Cascais
 Fort of Aguieira
 Forts of Ajuda 
 Fort of Alqueidão
 Fort of Arpim, Bucelas, Loures
 Fort of Arrifana
 Fort of Carvalha
 Fort of Casa
 Fort of Cego
 Fort of Consolation Beach
 Fort of Cresmina
 Fort of Feira, Malveira, Mafra
 Fort of Feiteira
 Fort of Giribita, Oeiras
 Fort of Greta, Horta
 Fort of Guincho, Cascais
 Fort of Leça da Palmeira, Porto
 Fort of Milreu, Ericeira
 Fort of Mosqueiro
 Fort of Negrito, Angra do Heroísmo
 Fort of Olheiros
 Castelo da Póvoa, Póvoa de Varzim
 Fort of Nossa Senhora da Encarnação, Lagoa
 Fort of Nossa Senhora da Guia (Cascais)
 Fort of Nossa Senhora das Mercês de Catalazete, Oeiras
 Fort of Nossa Senhora da Rocha, Lagoa
 Fort of Paimogo
 Fort of Pessegueiro Island, Sines
 Fort of Ponta da Bandeira, Lagos, Portugal
 Fort of Ribas
 Fort of Santa Catarina, Portimão
 Fort of Santo António de Belixe, Sagres
 Fort of Santo Amaro do Areeiro, Oeiras
 Fort of São Bruno, Oeiras, Lisbon District 
 Fort of São João Baptista, Berlengas, Peniche
 Fort of São João do Arade, Lagoa
 Fort of São Jorge at Oitavos
 Fort of São Julião da Barra, Oeiras, Lisbon District 
 Fort of São João Baptista, Angra do Heroísmo
 Fort of São Pedro do Estoril, Cascais
 Fort of São Sebastião de Caparica, Almada
 Fort of São Tiago, Funchal, Madeira
 Fort of São Teodósio da Cadaveira, Estoril
 Fort of São Vicente, Torres Vedras
 Forts of Serra da Aguieira
 Fort of Subserra
 Fort of Zambujal, Mafra
 Peniche Fortress
 Valença Fortress, Valença

Russia

 Alexandrov Kremlin
 Astrakhan Kremlin
 Fort Alexander (St. Petersburg)
 Gdov Kremlin
 Ivangorod fortress
 Kazan Kremlin
 Kolomna Kremlin
 Kronstadt
 Moscow Kremlin
 Nizhny Novgorod Kremlin
 Novgorod Kremlin
 Peter and Paul Fortress, Saint Petersburg
 Por-Bazhyn, Tuva Republic
 Tobolsk Kremlin
 Tula Kremlin
 Vladivostok Fortress

Saint Kitts and Nevis
 Brimstone Hill Fortress

Saint Vincent and the Grenadines
 Fort Charlotte

Saudi Arabia

 Maskmak Fortress

Serbia

Singapore

 Fort Canning
 Fort Pasir Panjang
 Fort Siloso
 Fort Tanjong Katong

South Africa

 Fort Amiel, KwaZulu-Natal
 Fort Beaufort, Eastern Cape
 Fort Cox, Eastern Cape
 Fort de Goede Hoop, Western Cape
 Fort Merensky, Mpumalanga
 Johannesburg Fort, Gauteng
 Fort Klapperkop, Gauteng
 Fort Schanskop, Gauteng
 Fort Wonderboompoort, Gauteng
 Redoubt Duijnhoop, Western Cape

South Korea
 Hwaseong Fortress, Suwon

Spain

A Coruña
 Muralla de Santiago de Compostela

Albacete
 Fort Chinchilla

Badajoz
 Fort Jerez de los Caballeros

Burgos
 Fort Cartagena

Cádiz

 Batería de Aspiroz
 Muelle de Gallineras
 Fuerte de Punta Carnero
 Fuerte de San García
 Batería de San Genís
 Fort San Marcos
 Batería de San Melitón de la Calavera
 Fort Sancti Petri (San Fernando)
 Batería de Urrutia

Province of Castellón
 Fort Peníscola

Córdoba
 Fort Molina de Aragón

Coria, Cáceres
 Fort Coria

Girona
 Fort Sant Ferran (Figueres)

Huelva
 Fort Cartaya
 Fort Niebla
 Fort Cortegana

Málaga
 Muralla urbana de Marbella

Menorca
 Fort San Felipe

Murcia
 Fort Caravaca de la Cruz

Navarre
 Fort Olite
 Fort San Cristóbal

Palma de Mallorca
 Fort Bellver

Segovia
 Alcázar of Segovia

Soria
 Fort Berlanga de Duero

Toledo
 Fort Toledo

Valladolid

 Fort Encinas de Esgueva
 Fort Peñafiel
 Fort Simancas
 Fort Villalba de los Alcores

Zaragoza
 Aljaferia

Sri Lanka

Sweden

 Bodens fästning
 Carlsten
 Bohus Fästning
 Karlsborg Fortress

Taiwan (Republic of China)

 Cihou Fort
 Eternal Golden Castle
 Fort Provintia
 Fort Santo Domingo
 Fort Zeelandia
 Huwei Fort
 Uhrshawan Battery

Turkey

 Anadoluhisarı
 Dardanelles Fortified Area Command
 Diyarbakır Fortress
 Rumelihisarı
 Şeytan Castle
 Trapessac
 Walls of Constantinople
 Yedikule Fortress

Ukraine

 Dubno Castle
 Kyiv fortress
 Kodak Fortress
 Letychiv Fortress
 Lutsk Castle
 Lysa Hora
 Medzhybizh Fortress
 Okopy Świętej Trójcy
 Ostroh Castle
 Sevastopol
 Zaporizhian Sich

United Arab Emirates

 Al Baithnah Fort
 Al Fahidi Fort
 Al Mahatta Fort
 Al Jahili Fort
 Fujairah Fort
 Qasr al-Hosn
 Sakamkam Fort
 Sharjah Fort

United Kingdom
See also the list of castles, as many early forts were called castles, and many castle sites were reused for later fortifications. Also Palmerston Forts lists the many British fortifications built in the 1860s.

England

General
 Maunsell Sea Forts

SE England

 Dymchurch Redoubt
 Eastbourne Redoubt
 Fort Burgoyne
 Admiralty Pier Turret
 Dover Western Heights
 Littlehampton Fort
 Newhaven Fort
 Saxon Shore forts
 Shoreham Redoubt

Thames

 Coalhouse Fort
 Cliffe Fort
 New Tavern Fort
 Shornmead Fort
 Slough Fort
 Tilbury Fort

Medway

 Fort Horsted
 Fort Amherst
 Fort Borstal
 Fort Bridgewood
 Fort Clarence
 Fort Darnet
 Fort Luton
 Fort Hoo
 Fort Pitt
 Garrison Point Fort
 Grain Fort & Grain Tower Battery

Solent
Portsdown Hill

 Crookhorn Redoubt
 Fort Fareham
 Farlington Redoubt
 Fort Nelson
 Fort Southwick
 Fort Purbrook
 Fort Wallington
 Fort Widley

Gosport

 Fort Blockhouse
 Fort Brockhurst
 Fort Elson
 Fort Gilkicker
 Fort Grange
 Fort Monckton
 Fort Rowner

Portsmouth

 Fort Cumberland
 Lumps Fort

Sea Forts

 Horse Sand Fort
 No Mans Land Fort
 Spitbank Fort
 St Helens Fort

Isle of Wight

SW England
Bideford
Chudleigh Fort
 Berry Head
 Bristol Channel
 Brean Down Fort
Dartmouth
 Bayard's Cove Fort
Plymouth

 Royal Citadel
 Agaton Fort
 Breakwater Fort
 Cawsand Fort
 Crownhill Fort
 Ernesettle Fort
 Fort Bovisand
 Picklecombe Fort
 Polhawn Fort
 Fort Scraesdon
 Fort Tregantle
 Whitesand Bay Battery
 Woodlands Fort

Isle of Portland

 Verne Citadel
 East Weare Battery
 High Angle Battery
 Blacknor Fort

 Weymouth
 Nothe Fort

East Anglia

 Bath Side Battery
 Beacon Hill Battery
 Harwich Redoubt
 Landguard Fort
 Shotley Battery

NW England

 Liscard Battery
 Fort Perch Rock

NE England

 The Humber Forts
 Fort Paull
 The Tyne Turrets

Scotland

 Fort Charlotte, Shetland
 Fort George, Scotland

Wales

Milford Haven

 Dale Fort
 Fort Hubberstone
 Popton Fort
 Pill Fort
 Chapel Bay Fort
 South Hook Fort
 Fort Scoveston
 Stack Rock Fort
 Thorn Island Fort
 St Catherine's Fort

 Fort Belan

United States

Alabama

 Fort Armstrong
 Fort Bainbridge
 Fort Bibb
 Fort Bowyer
 Fort Carney
 Fort Claiborne
 Fort Crawford
 Fort Dale
 Fort Decatur
 Fort Easley
 Fort Gaines
 Fort Glass
 Fort Hampton
 Fort Harker
 Fort Hull
 Fort Jackson
 Fort Landrum
 Fort Leslie
 Fort Likens
 Fort Louis de la Mobile
 Fort Madison
 Fort McClellan
 Fort Mims
 Fort Mitchell
 Fort Morgan
 Fort Rucker
 Fort Sinquefield
 Fort Stoddert
 Fort Strother
 Fort Williams

Alaska

Fort Abercrombie
Fort Davis
Fort Egbert
Fort Gibbon
Fort Greely
Fort Liscum
Fort McGilvray
Fort Randall Army Airfield
Fort Raymond (Alaska)
Fort Richardson
Fort Rousseau
Fort St. Michael
Fort Schwatka
Fort Wainwright
Fort William H. Seward
Fort Yukon

Arizona

 Fort Apache
 Fort Bowie
 Fort Buchanan
 Fort Crittenden
 Fort Defiance
 Fort Grant
 Fort Huachuca
 Fort Lowell
 Fort McDowell
 Fort Misery
 Fort Mojave
 The Old Fort (Mormon)
 Fort Tyson
 Fort Utah
 Fort Verde
 Fort Whipple
 Fort Yuma

Arkansas

 Fort Carlos III
 Fort Chaffee
 Fort Curtis
 Fort Logan H. Roots
 Fort Lookout
 Fort Smith

California

Colorado

Connecticut

 Fort Griswold
 Fort Nathan Hale
 Fort Trumbull

Delaware

 Fort Casimir
 Fort Christina
 Fort Delaware
 Fort DuPont
 Fort Miles
 Fort Saulsbury

Florida

 Fort DeSoto

Georgia

Fort Benning
Fort Gaines
Fort Gordon
Fort Frederica
Fort Gillem
Fort Hawkins
Fort James Jackson (aka Old Fort Jackson or Fort Oglethorpe), historic fort open to the public
Fort King George
Fort McAllister
Fort McPherson
Fort at Point Petre, aka Fort Point Peter
Fort Pulaski
Fort Screven
Fort Stewart

Hawaii

 Fort DeRussy
 Fort Hase
 Fort Kamehameha
 Fort Ruger
 Russian Fort Elizabeth
 Schofield Barracks
 Fort Shafter

Idaho

 Fort Boise
 Camp Connor
 Fort Hall
 Fort Lapwai

Illinois

 Fort Armstrong
 Fort de Chartres
 Fort Dearborn
 Fort Johnson
 Fort Kaskaskia
 Fort Massac

Indiana

 Fort Benjamin Harrison
 Fort Sackville
 Fort Knox
 Fort Miami
 Fort Ouiatenon
 Fort Patrick Henry
 Fort Vincennes
 Fort Wayne

Iowa

 Fort Atkinson
 Fort Des Moines I, II, and III
 Fort Dodge
 Fort Madison

Kansas

 Fort Aubrey
 Aubry's Post
 Fort Bain
 Barnesville's Post
 Fort Belmont
 Fort Blair (Fort Scott)
 Fort Brooks
 Burlingame's Fort
 Camp Ben Butler
 Fort de Cavagnial
 Chapman's Dugout
 Fort Clifton
 Fort Clinton
 Coldwater Grove's Post
 Council Grove's Post
 Camp Defiance
 Fort Dodge
 Fort Drinkwater
 Camp Drywood
 Eggert House
 Fort Ellsworth
 Fort Folly
 Fort Harker
 Fort Hays
 Fort Henning
 Camp Hunter
 Indian Home Guard Camp (Baxter Springs)
 Fort Insley
 Fort Lane
 Fort Larned
 Fort Leavenworth
 Fort Lincoln
 Fort Lincoln blockhouse
 Fort Lookout
 Fort McKean
 Fort Montgomery (Eureka)
 Fort Montgomery (Linn County)
 Mount Oread Civil War posts
 Fort Riley
 Fort Row
 Fort Scott
 Fort Simple
 Fort Solomon
 Fort Sully (Fort Leavenworth)
 Fort Sumner
 Fort Wallace
 Fort Zarah

Kentucky

 Bryan Station
 Corn Island
 Floyd's Station
 Fort Allen
 Fort Boonesborough
 Fort Campbell
 Fort DeWolf
 Fort Duffield
 Fort Hill, Frankfort
 Fort Jefferson
 Fort Knox
 Fort Harrod
 Fort Hartford
 Fort Heiman
 Fort Nelson, Jessamine County
 Fort Nelson, Louisville
 Fort-on-Shore
 Fort Thomas
 Fort Vienna
 Fort William
 Low Dutch Station
 Newport Barracks
 Springs Station

Louisiana

 Fort Jackson
 Fort Dylan
 Fort Pike
 Fort Polk
 Fort Proctor / Fort Beauregard
 Fort St. Philip

Maine

Fort Allen
Fort Baldwin
Fort Edgecomb
Fort Foster
Fort George
Fort Gorges
Fort Halifax
Fort Kent
Fort Knox
Fort Levett
Fort Lyon
Fort McClary
Fort McKinley
Fort O'Brien
Fort Pentagouet
Peaks Island Military Reservation
Fort Popham
Fort Preble
Fort Scammel
Fort Sullivan
Fort Sumner
Fort Western
Fort Williams
Fort William Henry

Maryland

 Fort Armistead
 Fort Carroll
 Fort Cumberland
 Fort Defiance
 Fort Detrick
 Fort Frederick
 Fort George G. Meade
 Fort Marshall
 Fort McHenry
 Fort Severn
 Fort Washington

Massachusetts

 Acushnet Fort
 Fort Andrew
 Fort Andrews
 Fort Banks
 Beverly Fort
 Cow Fort
 Fort Dawes
 Fort Defiance
 Fort Devens
 Fort Duvall
 East Point Military Reservation
 Eastern Point Fort
 Gilbert Heights Fort
 Fort Glover
 Fort Heath
 Fort Independence
 Fort Juniper
 Fort Lee
 Long Point Battery
 Fort Miller
 Fort Nichols
 Old Stone Fort
 Fort Philip
 Fort Phoenix
 Fort Pickering
 Fort Revere
 Fort Ridiculous
 Fort Rodman
 Fort Ruckman
 Fort at Salisbury Point
 Stage Fort
 Fort Standish (Boston)
 Fort Standish (Plymouth)
 Fort Strong
 Fort Taber
 Fort Useless
 Fort Warren
 Fort Washington
 Fort Winthrop

Michigan

 Fort de Buade
 Fort Detroit
 Fort Holmes
 Fort Mackinac
 Fort Miami
 Fort Michilimackinac
 Fort St. Joseph (Niles)
 Fort St. Joseph (Port Huron), rebuilt as Fort Gratiot
 Fort Wayne (Detroit)

Minnesota

 Fort Beauharnois
 Fort Duquesne
 Fort L'Huillier
 Fort Ridgely
 Fort Ripley
 Fort St. Charles
 Fort Snelling

Mississippi

 Fort Massachusetts
 Fort Maurepas

Missouri

 Fort Bellefontaine
 Fort Cap au Gris
 Fort Leonard Wood
 Fort Osage
 Jefferson Barracks

Montana

 Fort Assinniboine
 Fort C. F. Smith
 Fort Ellis
 Fort Keogh
 Fort Parker
 Fort William Henry Harrison
 Fort Missoula

Nebraska

 Fort Atkinson
 Camp Atlanta
 Bordeaux Trading Post
 Cabanne's Trading Post
 Fort Calhoun
 Columbus Post
 Fort Cottonwood
 Fort Crook
 Fontenelle's Post
 Post at Grand Island
 Fort Heath
 Fort Kearny
 Fort Kiowa
 Fort Lisa
 Fort McPherson
 Fort Mitchell
 Fort Niobrara
 Omaha Quartermaster Depot
 Fort Omaha
 Pilcher's Post
 Ponca Fort (Nanza)
 Fort Robinson
 Camp Sheridan
 Fort Sheridan
 Sherman Barracks
 Fort Sidney

Nevada

 Fort Churchill
 Fort McDermit
 Old Mormon Fort
 Fort Ruby
 Fort Schellbourne

New Hampshire

 Fort Constitution
 Fort Dearborn
 Fort at Number 4
 Fort Stark
 Fort Wentworth
 Fort William and Mary

New Jersey

Fort Billingsport
Fort Dix
Highlands Military Reservation
Fort Lee
Fort Hancock
Fort Mercer
Fort Monmouth
Fort Mott
Fortifications of New Netherland
Fort Nonsense

New Mexico

 Fort Bascom
 Fort Bayard
 Fort Craig
 Fort Cummings
 Fort Fauntleroy (aka Fort Wingate)
 Fort Fillmore
 Fort Marcy
 Fort Selden
 Fort Stanton
 Fort Sumner
 Fort Tularosa
 Fort Union
 Fort Wingate (aka Fort Lyon)

New York

Fort Amsterdam
Castle Clinton
Fort Clinton
Fort Columbus
Fort Crown Point
Fort Drum
Fort Gansevoort
Fort Gibson
Fort Greene
Fort Hamilton
Camp Hero
Fort Jay
Fort Lafayette
Fort Lévis
Madison Barracks, begun as Fort Pike
Fort Michie
Fort Montgomery (Hudson River)
Fort Montgomery (Lake Champlain)
Forts of New Netherland
Fort Niagara
Fort Ontario
Fort de La Présentation
Fort Schuyler
Fort Slocum
Fort Stanwix, reconstructed living history museum
Fort Terry
Fort Ticonderoga
Fort Tilden
Fort Totten
Fort Tyler
Fort Wadsworth
Fort Washington
Fort William Henry
Castle Williams
Fort Wood
Fort H. G. Wright

North Carolina

Fort Bragg
Fort Caswell
Fort Fisher
Fort Greene
Fort Hampton
Fort Johnston
Fort Macon

North Dakota

 Fort Abercrombie
 Fort Abraham Lincoln
 Fort Buford
 Fort Clark
 Fort Mandan
 Fort Ransom
 Fort Stevenson
 Fort Totten
 Fort Union

Ohio

Oklahoma

 Fort Arbuckle
 Fort Cobb
 Fort Gibson
 Camp Gruber
 Fort McCulloch
 Fort Nichols
 Fort Reno
 Fort Sill
 Fort Supply
 Fort Towson
 Fort Washita
 Fort Wayne

Oregon

 Fort Astoria
 Fort Clatsop
 Fort Dalles
 Fort Hoskins
 Fort Klamath
 Fort Lane
 Fort Stevens
 Fort William
 Fort Yamhill

Pennsylvania

 Fort Allen
 Fort Antes
 Fort Augusta
 Fort Bedford
 Fort Black
 Fort Bosley
 Fort Deshler
 Fort Dickinson
 Fort Dupuy
 Fort Duquesne
 Fort Gaddis
 Fort Granville
 Fort Halifax
 Fort Hunter
 Fort Hyndshaw
 Fort Indiantown Gap
 Fort Jones (Mount Oliver)
 Fort Juniata Crossing
 Fort Lafayette
 Fort Laughlin
 Fort Le Boeuf
 Fort Ligonier
 Fort Loudoun
 Fort Machault
 Fort McIntosh
 Fort Mifflin
 Fort Necessity
 Fort Piper
 Fort Pitt
 Fort Presque Isle
 Fort Prince George
 Fort Robert Smalls
 Fort Roberdeau
 Fort Shirley
 Fort Venango
 Forty Fort
 Harbor Defenses of the Delaware
 Light's Fort
 List of forts in Washington County, Pennsylvania
 Redstone Old Fort
 Spark's Fort

Puerto Rico

 Fort Amezquita
 Fort Buchanan, Puerto Rico
 El Cañuelo
 Castillo San Cristóbal
 Fort San Felipe del Morro
 Fortín de San Gerónimo
 Fuerte de Vieques

Rhode Island

Fort Adams
Fort Anne
Fort Barton
Fort Burnside
Fort Church
Fort Dumpling
Fort Getty
Fort Greble
Fort Greene (Narragansett)
Fort Greene (Newport)
Fort Hamilton
Fort Kearny
Fort Mansfield
Fort Ninigret
Queen's Fort
Fort Varnum
Fort Wetherill
Fort Wolcott

South Carolina

The Battery
Fort Charlotte
Fort Fremont
Fort Howell
Fort Jackson
Fort Lyttleton, also called Fort Marion
Fort Motte
Fort Moultrie
Old Ninety Six and Star Fort
Castle Pinckney
Fort Prince George
Fort Sumter
Fort Wagner
Fort Walker, also called Fort Welles

South Dakota

 Fort Meade
 Fort Randall
 Fort Sully

Tennessee

Texas

 The Alamo
 Fort Bliss
 Fort Brown
 Fort Concho
 Fort Crockett
 Fort D. A. Russell
 Fort Davis
 Fort Hood
 Fort Saint Louis
 Fort Wolters
 Fort Worth

Utah

 Fort Buenaventura
 Cove Fort
 Fort Deseret
 Fort Douglas
 Fort Duchesne
 Fort Cameron
 Fort Utah

Vermont

Virginia

Fort A.P. Hill
Fort Albany
Craney Island Fort
Fort Ethan Allen
Fort Eustis
Fort Hunt
Fort John Custis
Fort Lee
Fort Loudoun
Fort Monroe
Fort Nelson
Fort Norfolk
Fort Myer
Fort Pickett
Fort Richardson
Battery Rodgers
Fort Scott
Fort Story
Fort Ward
Fort Wool

Virgin Islands (U.S.)

 Fort Christian
 Fort Frederik
 Fort Segarra

Washington

 Fort Columbia
 Fort Colville
 Fort Dent
 Fort George Wright
 Fort Lawton
 Fort Lewis
 Fort Nez Percés (aka Old Fort Walla Walla)
 Fort Nisqually
 Fort Okanogan
 Fort Simcoe
 Fort Vancouver
 Fort Walla Walla
 Fort Ward
 Fort Worden

Washington, D.C.

 Fort DeRussy
 Fort McNair
 Fort Stanton
 Fort Stevens
 Fort Totten
 The Pentagon

West Virginia

 Fort Ashby
 Fort Milroy
 Fort Pearsall
 Prickett's Fort
 Fort Randolph

Wisconsin

 Fort Crawford
 Fort Howard
 Fort McCoy
 Fort Shelby/Fort McKay
 Fort Winnebago
 Fort Atkinson

Wyoming

 Fort Bridger
 Fort Caspar
 Fort D.A. Russell
 Fort Fetterman
 Fort Francis E. Warren, now the Francis E. Warren Air Force Base
 Fort Halleck
 Fort Laramie
 Fort Phil Kearny
 Fort Platte
 Fort Reno
 Fort Sanders
 Camp Stambaugh
 Fort Supply
 Fort Washakie
 Fort Yellowstone

Cities and areas with "Fort" in the name

 Fort Bragg, California
 Fort Bridger, Wyoming
 Fort Collins, Colorado
 Fort Garland, Colorado
 Fort Hunt, Virginia
 Fort Laramie, Wyoming
 Fort Lauderdale, Florida
 Fort Lawn, South Carolina
 Fort Lee, New Jersey
 Fort Lupton, Colorado
 Fort Mill, South Carolina
 Fort Morgan, Colorado
 Fort Myers, Florida
 Fort Pierre, South Dakota
 Fort Rock, Oregon
 Fort Smith, Arkansas
 Fort Stockton, Texas
 Fort Thomas, Kentucky
 Fort Walton Beach, Florida
 Fort Washakie, Wyoming
 Fort Wayne, Indiana
 Fort Worth, Texas

See also
 List of castles
 List of fortifications

References

Forts